Karen Hummer (born February 25, 1962), from Cranford, New Jersey, is a former competitor in Judo and a US National Champion.

Early life
Hummer began judo as a child when her father was a judo instructor at the Judo and Karate Center in Cranford, New Jersey. At age 12, as a third degree brown belt, she competed in the US National Championship in Judo. She defeated four opponents to earn a win.

Career
Prior to competing at the National Championship, Hummmer earned wins at various state tournaments including one held at Trenton State College. She trained out of New Jersey under judo instructor and two time U.S. Olympic Judo Team coach Yoshisada Yonezuka.

In 1974, she was the youngest competitor in the Senior USA AAU Nationals at Arizona and the youngest person to ever win the AAU USA National Senior Champions.

Hummer is believed to be the youngest national championship winner at the age in Judo history.

References

1962 births
Living people
People from Cranford, New Jersey
American female judoka
21st-century American women
Sportspeople from New Jersey